Eric Rücker Eddison, CB, CMG (24 November 1882 – 18 August 1945) was an English civil servant and author, writing epic fantasy novels under the name E. R. Eddison. His notable works include The Worm Ouroboros (1922) and the Zimiamvian Trilogy (1935–1958).

Biography
Born in Adel, Leeds, Eddison's early education came from a series of private tutors, whom he shared with the young Arthur Ransome.  Ransome recalls Eddison's daring and Machiavellian methods of getting rid of unpopular teachers in his autobiography.  Afterwards Eddison was educated at Eton and Trinity College, Oxford and joined the Board of Trade in 1906, retiring in 1938 to work full-time on his fiction. He was also a member of the Viking Society for Northern Research. During a distinguished career he was appointed a Companion of the Order of St. Michael and St. George in 1924 and a Companion of the Order of the Bath in 1929 for public service with the Board of Trade. He and his wife, Winifred, had one child, a daughter. Their son-in-law, Kenneth Hesketh Higson, a Royal Air Force pilot, died in an air fight over Italy in the Second World War.

Writing
Eddison is best known for the early romance The Worm Ouroboros (1922) and for three volumes set in the imaginary world Zimiamvia, known as the Zimiamvian Trilogy: Mistress of Mistresses (1935), A Fish Dinner in Memison (1941), and The Mezentian Gate (1958).

Eddison was an occasional member of the Inklings, an informal literary discussion group associated with the University of Oxford, and his early works of high fantasy drew strong praise from J. R. R. Tolkien and C. S. Lewis, both of whom were also members of the group. When Lewis had to go into a nursing home, he asked his secretary to bring him two books: The Worm Ouroboros and Virgil’s Aeneid. Later, Eddison's early works would also draw praise from Ursula K. Le Guin. Tolkien generally approved of Eddison's literary style, but found the underlying philosophy unpleasant and unattractive; while Eddison in turn thought Tolkien's views "soft". Other admirers of Eddison's work included James Stephens, who wrote the introduction to the 1922 edition; James Branch Cabell, who provided a foreword for the 1926 American edition; Robert Silverberg, who described The Worm Ouroboros as "the greatest high fantasy of them all"; and Clive Barker.

Eddison's books are written in a meticulously recreated Jacobean prose style, seeded throughout with fragments, often acknowledged but often directly copied from his favorite authors and genres: Homer and Sappho, Shakespeare and Webster, Norse sagas and French medieval lyric poems. Critic Andy Sawyer has noted that such fragments seem to arise naturally from the "barbarically sophisticated" worlds Eddison has created. The books exhibit a thoroughly aristocratic sensibility; heroes and villains alike maintain an Olympian indifference to convention.  Fellow fantasy author Michael Moorcock wrote that Eddison's characters, particularly his villains, are more vivid than Tolkien's.  Others have observed that while it is historically accurate to depict the great of the world trampling on the lower classes, Eddison's characters often treat their subjects with arrogance and insolence, and this is depicted as part of their greatness. Indeed, at the end of The Worm Ouroboros, the heroes, finding peace dull, pray for – and get – the revival of their enemies, so that they may go and fight them again. Fantasy historian Brian Attebery notes that "Eddison's fantasies uphold a code that is unabashedly Nietzschean; had he written after World War II, his enthusiasm for supermen and heroic conflict might perhaps have been tempered".

The Zimiamvia books were conceived not as a trilogy but as part of a larger work left incomplete at Eddison's death.  The Mezentian Gate itself is unfinished, though Eddison provided summaries of the missing chapters shortly before his death. C. S. Lewis wrote a blurb for the cover of The Mezentian Gate when it was published calling Eddison's works "first and foremost, of art." Some additional material from this book was published for the first time in the volume Zimiamvia: A Trilogy (1992).

Eddison wrote three other books: Poems, Letters, and Memories of Philip Sidney Nairn (1916), Styrbiorn the Strong (1926) and Egil's Saga (1930). The first was his tribute to a Trinity College friend, a poet, who, according to this source, died May 18, 1914, age 30, in Malaya, where he was a colonial administrator. According to another, possibly less reliable source, he is said to have died in his youth during World War I. The other two relate to the saga literature; the first is a historical novel which retells Styrbjarnar þáttr Svíakappa (alluded to in Eyrbyggja Saga and Heimskringla). The second is a direct translation from Egil's saga, supplemented with extensive notes, some which explain Eddison's aesthetic and philosophical outlook.

In the 1960s Eddison’s wife, Winifred, bequeathed many of his original manuscripts and notes to the Leeds Central Library.

Bibliography

Zimiamvia
The Worm Ouroboros (1922).  London: Jonathan Cape
Mistress of Mistresses (1935).  London: Faber and Faber.
A Fish Dinner in Memison (1941).  New York: E. P. Dutton & Co.
The Mezentian Gate (1958).  London: Curwen Press.

Norse
Styrbiorn the Strong (1926).  London: Jonathan Cape.
Egil's Saga (1930).  London: Cambridge University Press.

Omnibus
Zimiamvia: A Trilogy (1992).  New York: Dell Publishing.  .
The Complete Zimiamvia (1992).  New York: Dell Publishing.

Non-fiction
Poems, Letters, and Memories of Philip Sidney Nairn (1916).  London: Printed for Private Circulation.
 (in part)

References

Further reading
 Lin Carter "The World's Edge, and Beyond: The Fiction of Dunsany, Eddison and Cabell" in Imaginary Worlds: The Art of Fantasy. NY: Ballantine Books, 1973, 27–48.
 Don D'Ammassa. "Villains of Necessity: The Works of E.R. Eddison" in Darrell Schweitzer (ed). Discovering Classic Fantasy Fiction, Gillette NJ: Wildside Press, 1986, pp. 88–93.

External links

 
 
 E.R. Eddison: Civil Servant, Norse Scholar and Author of Heroic Fantasy – copyright E.R. Eddison Estate
 
 The Worm Ouroboros at Internet Sacred Text Archive
 
 

Companions of the Order of St Michael and St George
Companions of the Order of the Bath
1882 births
1945 deaths
People educated at Eton College
English fantasy writers
Zimiamvia
20th-century English novelists
20th-century British short story writers
English historical novelists
Writers of historical fiction set in the Middle Ages
English male novelists